Escape from Fire Mountain is the third novel in World of Adventure series by Gary Paulsen. It was published on January 1, 1995 by Yearling.

Plot
This story features a thirteen-year-old by the name of Nikki Roberts who hears a cry for help over her CB radio. After hearing this, she sets out to rescue them. They were caught in the middle of a forest fire.

Publication
It was later turned into a three part omnibus along with Danger on Midnight River and Hook 'Em Snotty! by Random House on February 14, 2006.

Novels by Gary Paulsen
1995 American novels
American young adult novels